Charlie's Ghost Story, also known as Charlie's Ghost: The Secret of Coronado, is a 1995 American adventure-comedy film directed by Anthony Edwards, at his directorial debut. Based on a story by Mark Twain, it stars Cheech Marin, Trenton Knight, Anthony Edwards and Linda Fiorentino.

Plot
An archaeologist (Anthony Edwards) finds remains of a famous explorer (Cheech Marin) and moves them to a museum. This causes the spirit of the explorer to become restless. He wants his bones properly buried and returns as a ghost to seek help from a 12-year-old boy named Charlie (Trenton Knight).

Cast 
  
 Cheech Marin as  Coronado
 Trenton Knight  as Charlie
 Anthony Edwards as 	Dave
 Linda Fiorentino as 	Marta
 Charles Rocket as 	Van Leer
 Daphne Zuniga as 	Ronda
 Robert Hy Gorman as 	Tuggle  
 Veronica Lauren  as 	Ncki
 J. T. Walsh as 	Darryl
 Dean Cameron as 	Sheriff
  Bethany Richards  as 	Terri
 Stephen Kearney as 	Mover

References

External links 

1990s adventure comedy films
American adventure comedy films
Films based on works by Mark Twain
1995 directorial debut films
1995 comedy films
1995 films
1990s English-language films
1990s American films